Michael L. Gambino (born July 9, 1977) is an American college baseball coach, the head coach of the Boston College Eagles baseball team.  He was named to the position in July 2010.  Prior to accepting the head coaching position at Boston College, he served as an assistant at Boston College, scouted for the Detroit Tigers, and served as an assistant at Virginia Tech.

Gambino played college baseball at Boston College from 1997–2000. In 1998, he played collegiate summer baseball for the Orleans Cardinals of the Cape Cod Baseball League. In June 2000, he signed as an undrafted free agent with the Boston Red Sox and played two seasons of minor league baseball in their system.

Head coaching record
Below is a table of Gambino's yearly records as an NCAA head baseball coach.

References

External links

Boston College Eagles bio
Virginia Tech Hokies bio

1977 births
Living people
Boston College Eagles baseball players
Orleans Firebirds players
Gulf Coast Red Sox players
Augusta GreenJackets players
Lowell Spinners players
Boston College Eagles baseball coaches
Virginia Tech Hokies baseball coaches
People from Cold Spring, New York
Baseball coaches from New York (state)